Çöreklik is a village in the Şahinbey District, Gaziantep Province, Turkey. The village had a population of 70 in 2022.

In late 19th century, German orientalist Martin Hartmann listed the village as a settlement of 5 houses inhabited by Turks.

References

Villages in Şahinbey District